The 2011–12 New York Knicks season was the 66th season of the franchise in the National Basketball Association (NBA). The Knicks finished the regular season with a 36–30 record and a seventh place in the Eastern Conference to reach the 2012 NBA Playoffs where they lost in the first round against the eventual NBA champion Miami Heat in five games. Notable events of the season included coach Mike D'Antoni's resignation, the surge in popularity of 23-year-old point guard Jeremy Lin during a seven-game winning streak (Linsanity), and the Knicks winning their first playoff game since 2001 against the Miami Heat, snapping an NBA-record 13-game playoff losing streak.

Key dates
 June 23: The 2011 NBA draft took place at Prudential Center in Newark, New Jersey.
 July 1: The CBA expires and the 2011 NBA Lockout begins.
 December 8: The player and the owners ratified a new 10-year CBA ending the 161-day lockout.
 December 9: Free Agency and Training camps begin.
 December 25: The regular season begins with a match against the Boston Celtics in the Madison Square Garden.
 April 19: The Knicks clinched a spot in the 2012 NBA Playoffs.
 May 9: The Knicks' season ends with a game 5 loss to the Miami Heat.

Draft picks

Roster

Pre-season
Due to the 2011 NBA lockout negotiations, the programmed pre-season schedule, along with the first two weeks of the regular season were scrapped, and a two-game pre-season was set for each team once the lockout concluded.

Game log

|- style="background:#cfc;"
| 1
| December 17
| @ New Jersey
| 
| Renaldo Balkman (20)
| Landry Fields (7)
| Toney Douglas (5)
| Prudential Center13,027
| 1–0
|- style="background:#cfc;"
| 2
| December 21
| New Jersey
| 
| Carmelo Anthony (21)
| Tyson Chandler (12)
| Carmelo AnthonyToney DouglasLandry FieldsIman Shumpert (3)
| Madison Square Garden19,763
| 2–0

Regular season

After a lack-luster start to the season where the Knicks had 8 wins and 13 losses in their first 21 games, Jeremy Lin burst on the scene. Injuries forced coach Mike D'Antoni to name Lin as the starting point guard, and Lin responded with averages of 27.3 points, 8.3 assists and 2.0 steals in his first four starts.  Lin closed the February 14th game against Toronto with a game-winning three-pointer that left 0.5 seconds on the clock.

However, when Carmelo Anthony returned from injury in late February, the Knicks hot streak ended.  After a 6-game losing streak to start the month of March, Mike D'Antoni resigned as coach, and was replaced by his assistant Mike Woodson. The Knicks ended the season strong 18-6 under Woodson.

However, the magic was gone as Lin suffered a knee injury against the Detroit Pistons. He underwent surgery days after and was placed on injured reserve, ending his season.

Game log

|- style="background:#cfc;"
| 1
| December 25
| Boston
| 
| Carmelo Anthony (37)
| Carmelo Anthony (8)
| Toney Douglas (4)
| Madison Square Garden19,763
| 1–0
|- style="background:#fcc;"
| 2
| December 28
| @ Golden State
| 
| Amar'e Stoudemire (16)
| Amar'e Stoudemire (10)
| Mike Bibby (4)
| Oracle Arena19,596
| 1–1
|- style="background:#fcc;"
| 3
| December 29
| @ L. A. Lakers
| 
| Carmelo Anthony (27)
| Tyson Chandler (11)
| Carmelo Anthony (5)
| Staples Center18,997
| 1–2
|- style="background:#cfc;"
| 4
| December 31
| @ Sacramento
| 
| Carmelo Anthony (23)
| Josh Harrellson (12)
| Toney Douglas (8)
| Power Balance Pavilion16,175
| 2–2

|- style="background:#fcc;"
| 5
| January 2
| Toronto
| 
| Carmelo Anthony (35)
| Carmelo Anthony (11)
| Landry Fields (5)
| Madison Square Garden19,763
| 2–3
|- style="background:#fcc;"
| 6
| January 4
| Charlotte
| 
| Carmelo Anthony (32)
| Amar'e Stoudemire (12)
| Carmelo Anthony,Toney Douglas (5)
| Madison Square Garden19,763
| 2–4
|- style="background:#cfc;"
| 7
| January 6
| @ Washington
| 
| Carmelo Anthony (37)
| Tyson Chandler (15)
| Iman Shumpert (7)
| Verizon Center16,998
| 3–4
|- style="background:#cfc;"
| 8
| January 7
| @ Detroit
| 
| Amar'e Stoudemire (22)
| Tyson Chandler (9)
| Carmelo Anthony (7)
| The Palace of Auburn Hills12,044
| 4–4
|- style="background:#cfc;"
| 9
| January 9
| Charlotte
| 
| Amar'e Stoudemire (25)
| Tyson Chandler (13)
| Carmelo Anthony (6)
| Madison Square Garden19,763
| 5–4
|- style="background:#cfc;"
| 10
| January 11
| Philadelphia
| 
| Carmelo Anthony (27)
| Tyson Chandler (13)
| Carmelo Anthony (5)
| Madison Square Garden19,763
| 6–4
|- style="background:#fcc;"
| 11
| January 12
| @ Memphis
| 
| Carmelo Anthony,Bill Walker (14)
| Tyson Chandler (11)
| Toney Douglas (4)
| FedExForum15,324
| 6–5
|- style="background:#fcc;"
| 12
| January 14
| @ Oklahoma City
| 
| Amar'e Stoudemire (14)
| Bill Walker (7)
| Bill Walker (3)
| Chesapeake Energy Arena18,203
| 6–6
|- style="background:#fcc;"
| 13
| January 16
| Orlando
| 
| Carmelo Anthony (33)
| Carmelo Anthony,Tyson Chandler (8)
| Carmelo Anthony (5)
| Madison Square Garden19,763
| 6–7
|- style="background:#fcc;"
| 14
| January 18
| Phoenix
| 
| Amar'e Stoudemire (23)
| Tyson Chandler (17)
| Carmelo Anthony,Tyson Chandler,Landry Fields (4)
| Madison Square Garden19,763
| 6–8
|- style="background:#fcc;"
| 15
| January 20
| Milwaukee
| 
| Carmelo Anthony (35)
| Tyson Chandler (12)
| Iman Shumpert (5)
| Madison Square Garden19,763
| 6–9
|- style="background:#fcc;"
| 16
| January 21
| Denver
| 
| Carmelo Anthony (25)
| Amar'e Stoudemire (11)
| Landry Fields,Iman Shumpert (7)
| Madison Square Garden19,763
| 6–10
|- style="background:#cfc;"
| 17
| January 24
| @ Charlotte
| 
| Tyson Chandler (20)
| Tyson Chandler (17)
| Landry Fields (5)
| Time Warner Cable Arena16,802
| 7–10
|- style="background:#fcc;"
| 18
| January 25
| @ Cleveland
| 
| Amar'e Stoudemire (19)
| Amar'e Stoudemire (14)
| Carmelo Anthony (6)
| Quicken Loans Arena16,760
| 7–11
|- style="background:#fcc;"
| 19
| January 27
| @ Miami
| 
| Bill Walker (21)
| Tyson Chandler (12)
| Landry Fields,Toney Douglas (5)
| American Airlines Arena19,707
| 7–12
|- style="background:#fcc;"
| 20
| January 28
| @ Houston
| 
| Amar'e Stoudemire (23)
| Tyson Chandler (11)
| Jeremy Lin (6)
| Toyota Center18,051
| 7–13
|- style="background:#cfc;"
| 21
| January 31
| Detroit
| 
| Carmelo Anthony (25)
| Tyson Chandler (8)
| Carmelo Anthony,Iman Shumpert (6)
| Madison Square Garden19,763
| 8–13

|- style="background:#fcc;"
| 22
| February 2
| Chicago
| 
| Amar'e Stoudemire (34)
| Amar'e Stoudemire (11)
| Iman Shumpert (8)
| Madison Square Garden19,763
| 8–14
|- style="background:#fcc;"
| 23
| February 3
| @ Boston
| 
| Carmelo Anthony (26)
| Amar'e Stoudemire,Tyson Chandler (11)
| Carmelo Anthony (6)
| TD Garden18,624
| 8–15
|- style="background:#cfc;"
| 24
| February 4
| New Jersey
| 
| Jeremy Lin (25)
| Jared Jeffries (10)
| Jeremy Lin (7)
| Madison Square Garden19,763
| 9–15
|- style="background:#cfc;"
| 25
| February 6
| Utah
| 
| Jeremy Lin (28)
| Jared Jeffries (8)
| Jeremy Lin (8)
| Madison Square Garden19,763
| 10–15
|- style="background:#cfc;"
| 26
| February 8
| @ Washington
| 
| Tyson Chandler (25)
| Tyson Chandler (11)
| Jeremy Lin (10)
| Verizon Center17,376
| 11–15
|- style="background:#cfc;"
| 27
| February 10
| L. A. Lakers
| 
| Jeremy Lin (38)
| Tyson Chandler (11)
| Jeremy Lin (7)
| Madison Square Garden19,763
| 12–15
|- style="background:#cfc;"
| 28
| February 11
| @ Minnesota
| 
| Jeremy LinIman Shumpert (20)
| Jared Jeffries (8)
| Jeremy Lin (8)
| Target Center20,232
| 13–15
|- style="background:#cfc;"
| 29
| February 14
| @ Toronto
| 
| Jeremy Lin (27)
| Amar'e Stoudemire,Tyson Chandler (9)
| Jeremy Lin (11)
| Air Canada Centre20,092
| 14–15
|- style="background:#cfc;"
| 30
| February 15
| Sacramento
| 
| Landry Fields (15)
| Landry Fields (10)
| Jeremy Lin (13)
| Madison Square Garden19,763
| 15–15
|- style="background:#fcc;"
| 31
| February 17
| New Orleans
| 
| Amar'e Stoudemire,Jeremy Lin (26)
| Amar'e Stoudemire (12)
| Jeremy Lin (5)
| Madison Square Garden19,763
| 15–16
|- style="background:#cfc;"
| 32
| February 19
| Dallas
| 
| Jeremy Lin (28)
| Tyson Chandler (10)
| Jeremy Lin (14)
| Madison Square Garden19,763
| 16–16
|- style="background:#fcc;"
| 33
| February 20
| New Jersey
| 
| Jeremy Lin (21)
| Landry Fields (11)
| Jeremy Lin (9)
| Madison Square Garden19,763
| 16–17
|- style="background:#cfc;"
| 34
| February 22
| Atlanta
| 
| Jeremy Lin, Steve Novak (17)
| Amar'e Stoudemire (10)
| Jeremy Lin (9)
| Madison Square Garden19,763
| 17–17
|- style="background:#fcc;"
| 35
| February 23
| @ Miami
| 
| Carmelo Anthony (19)
| Tyson Chandler (9)
| Jeremy Lin, J.R. Smith, Baron Davis (3)
| American Airlines Arena20,197
| 17–18
|- style="background:#cfc;"
| 36
| February 29
| Cleveland
| 
| Carmelo Anthony (22)
| Tyson Chandler (15)
| Jeremy Lin (7)
| Madison Square Garden19,763
| 18–18

|- style="background:#fcc;"
| 37
| March 4
| @ Boston
| 
| Carmelo Anthony (25)
| Tyson Chandler (14)
| Baron Davis (7)
| TD Garden18,624
| 18–19
|- style="background:#fcc;"
| 38
| March 6
| @ Dallas
| 
| Amar'e Stoudemire (26)
| Landry Fields (10)
| Jeremy Lin (7)
| American Airlines Center20,605
| 18–20
|- style="background:#fcc;"
| 39
| March 7
| @ San Antonio
| 
| Carmelo Anthony (27)
| Amar'e Stoudemire (11)
| Baron Davis (8)
| AT&T Center18,581
| 18–21
|- style="background:#fcc;"
| 40
| March 9
| @ Milwaukee
| 
| Amar'e Stoudemire (27)
| Amar'e Stoudemire (11)
| Jeremy Lin (13)
| Bradley Center18,717
| 18–22
|- style="background:#fcc;"
| 41
| March 11
| Philadelphia
| 
| Carmelo Anthony (22)
| Tyson Chandler (12)
| Jeremy Lin (7)
| Madison Square Garden19,763
| 18–23
|- style="background:#fcc;"
| 42
| March 12
| @ Chicago
| 
| Carmelo Anthony (21)
| Tyson Chandler (10)
| Jeremy Lin (8)
| United Center22,863
| 18–24
|- style="background:#cfc;"
| 43
| March 14
| Portland
| 
| J.R. Smith (25)
| Amar'e Stoudemire (8)
| Baron Davis (10)
| Madison Square Garden19,763
| 19–24
|- style="background:#cfc;"
| 44
| March 16
| Indiana
| 
| Tyson Chandler, J.R. Smith (16)
| Carmelo Anthony, Tyson Chandler, Landry Fields (7)
| Carmelo Anthony, Jeremy Lin (5)
| Madison Square Garden19,763
| 20–24
|- style="background:#cfc;"
| 45
| March 17
| @ Indiana
| 
| Jeremy Lin (19)
| Tyson Chandler (9)
| Jeremy Lin (7)
| Bankers Life Fieldhouse18,165
| 21–24
|- style="background:#cfc;"
| 46
| March 20
| Toronto
| 
| Amar'e Stoudemire (22)
| Amar'e Stoudemire (12)
| Jeremy Lin (10)
| Madison Square Garden19,763
| 22–24
|- style="background:#cfc;"
| 47
| March 21
| @ Philadelphia
| 
| Amar'e Stoudemire (21)
| Amar'e Stoudemire (9)
| Jeremy Lin (5)
| Wells Fargo Center20,470
| 23–24
|- style="background:#fcc;"
| 48
| March 23
| @ Toronto
| 
| Amar'e Stoudemire (17)
| Tyson Chandler (11)
| Baron Davis (8)
| Air Canada Centre19,800
| 23–25
|- style="background:#cfc;"
| 49
| March 24
| Detroit
| 
| Amar'e Stoudemire (17)
| Tyson Chandler (17)
| Landry Fields (4)
| Madison Square Garden19,763
|  24–25
|- style="background:#cfc;"
| 50
| March 26
| Milwaukee
| 
| Carmelo Anthony (28)
| Carmelo Anthony (12)
| Baron Davis (7)
| Madison Square Garden19,763
| 25–25
|- style="background:#cfc;"
| 51
| March 28
| Orlando
| 
| Carmelo Anthony (25)Iman Shumpert (25)
| Tyson Chandler (9)
| Carmelo Anthony (6)Baron Davis (6)
| Madison Square Garden19,763
| 26–25
|- style="background:#fcc;"
| 52
| March 30
| @ Atlanta
| 
| Carmelo Anthony (36)
| Carmelo Anthony,Tyson Chandler (9)
| Baron Davis (4)
| Philips Arena18,389
| 26–26
|- style="background:#cfc;"
| 53
| March 31
| Cleveland
| 
| J.R. Smith (20)
| Tyson Chandler (12)
| Baron Davis (5)
| Madison Square Garden19,763
| 27–26

|- style="background:#fcc;"
| 54
| April 3
| @ Indiana
| 
| Carmelo Anthony (39)
| Tyson Chandler (14)
| J.R. Smith (4)
| Bankers Life Fieldhouse17,042
| 27–27
|- style="background:#cfc;"
| 55
| April 5
| @ Orlando
| 
| Carmelo Anthony (19)
| Tyson Chandler (12)
| J.R. Smith (9)
| Amway Center19,098
| 28–27
|- style="background:#cfc;"
| 56
| April 8
| Chicago
| 
| Carmelo Anthony (43)
| Tyson Chandler (16)
| Iman Shumpert (6)
| Madison Square Garden19,763
| 29–27
|- style="background:#fcc;"
| 57
| April 10
| @ Chicago
| 
| Carmelo Anthony (29)
| Tyson Chandler (15)
| Baron Davis (6)
| United Center22,131
| 29–28
|- style="background:#cfc;"
| 58
| April 11
| @ Milwaukee
| 
| Carmelo Anthony (32)
| Tyson Chandler (11)
| Landry Fields (6)
| Bradley Center15,534
| 30–28
|- style="background:#cfc;"
| 59
| April 13
| Washington
| 
| J.R. Smith (23)
| Tyson Chandler (15)
| J.R. Smith (6)
| Madison Square Garden19,763
| 31–28
|- style="background:#fcc;"
| 60
| April 15
| Miami
| 
| Carmelo Anthony (42)
| Carmelo Anthony (9)
| Carmelo Anthony, Iman Shumpert (5)
| Madison Square Garden19,763
| 31–29
|- style="background:#cfc;"
| 61
| April 17
| Boston
| 
| Carmelo Anthony (35)
| Carmelo Anthony (12)
| Carmelo Anthony (10)
| Madison Square Garden19,763
| 32–29
|- style="background:#cfc;"
| 62
| April 18
| @ New Jersey
| 
| Carmelo Anthony (35)
| Tyson Chandler (10)
| Mike Bibby (8)
| Prudential Center18,711
| 33–29
|- style="background:#fcc;"
| 63
| April 20
| @ Cleveland
| 
| Steve Novak, Amar'e Stoudemire (15)
| Toney Douglas (9)
| Toney Douglas, J.R. Smith (6)
| Quicken Loans Arena19,349
| 33–30
|- style="background:#cfc;"
| 64
| April 22
| @ Atlanta
| 
| Carmelo Anthony (39)
| Amar'e Stoudemire (12)
| Baron Davis (10)
| Philips Arena18,158
| 34–30
|- style="background:#cfc;"
| 65
| April 25
| L. A. Clippers
| 
| J.R. Smith (21)
| Iman Shumpert, Amar'e Stoudemire (7)
| Mike Bibby, J.R. Smith (5)
| Madison Square Garden19,763
| 35–30
|- style="background:#cfc;"
| 66
| April 26
| @ Charlotte
| 
| J.R. Smith (22)
| Josh Harrellson (9)
| Mike Bibby (13)
| Time Warner Cable Arena16,023
| 36–30

Standings

Record vs. opponents

Player statistics

|- style="text-align:center;" bgcolor=""
|  || 55 || 55 ||style="background:#ff8c00;"| 34.1 || .430 || .335 || .804 || 6.3 || 3.6 || 1.1 || 0.4 ||style="background:#ff8c00;"| 22.6
|-  style="text-align:center; background:#f0f0f0;"
|  || 14 || 0 || 8.2 || .500  || .222 || .727 || 1.9 || 0.4 || 0.3 || 0.2 || 3.0
|- style="text-align:center;" bgcolor=""
|  || 39 || 4 || 14.3 || .282 || .318 || .750 || 1.5 || 2.1 || 0.5 || 0.1 || 2.6
|-  style="text-align:center; background:#f0f0f0;"
|  || 62 ||style="background:#ff8c00;"| 62 || 33.2 ||style="background:#ff8c00;"| .679 || .000 || .689 ||style="background:#ff8c00;"| 9.9 || 0.9 || 0.9 ||style="background:#ff8c00;"| 1.4 || 11.3
|- style="text-align:center;" bgcolor=""
|  || 29 || 14 || 20.5 || .370 || .306 || .667 || 1.9 || 4.7 || 1.2 || 0.1 || 6.1
|-  style="text-align:center; background:#f0f0f0;"
|  || 38 || 9 || 17.3 || .324 || .231 || .846 || 1.9 || 2.0 || 0.8 || 0.0 || 6.2
|- style="text-align:center;" bgcolor=""
|  ||style="background:#ff8c00;"| 66 ||style="background:#ff8c00;"| 62 || 28.7 || .460 || .256 || .562 || 4.2 || 2.6 || 1.2 || 0.3 || 8.8
|-  style="text-align:center; background:#f0f0f0;"
|  || 2 || 0 || 6.5 || .000 || .000 || .000 || 2.5 || 0.0 || 0.5 || 0.5 || 0.0
|- style="text-align:center;" bgcolor=""
|  || 37 || 4 || 14.6 || .423 || .339 || .615 || 3.9 || 0.3 || 0.6 || 0.5 || 4.4
|-  style="text-align:center; background:#f0f0f0;"
|  || 39 || 4 || 18.7 || .410 || .188 || .681 || 3.9 || 0.7 || 0.7 || 0.6 || 4.4
|- style="text-align:center;" bgcolor=""
|  || 21 || 0 || 5.1 || .515 || .000 || .800 || 1.3 || 0.2 || 0.0 || 0.3 || 2.0
|-  style="text-align:center; background:#f0f0f0;"
|  || 35 || 25 || 26.9 || .446 || .320 || .798 || 3.1 ||style="background:#ff8c00;"| 6.2 || 1.6 || 0.3 || 14.6
|- style="text-align:center;" bgcolor=""
|   || 54 || 0 || 18.9 || .478 ||style="background:#ff8c00;"| .472 || .846 || 1.9 || 0.2 || 0.3 || 0.2 || 8.8
|-  style="text-align:center; background:#f0f0f0;"
|  || 59 || 35 || 28.9 || .401 || .306 || .798 || 3.2 || 2.8 ||style="background:#ff8c00;"| 1.7 || 0.1 || 9.5
|- style="text-align:center;" bgcolor=""
|  || 35 || 1 || 27.6 || .407 || .347 || .709 || 3.9 || 2.4 || 1.5 || 0.2 || 12.5
|-  style="text-align:center; background:#f0f0f0;"
|  || 47 || 47 || 32.8 || .483 || .238 || .765 || 7.8 || 1.1 || 0.8 || 1.0 || 17.5
|- style="text-align:center;" bgcolor=""
|  || 32 || 8 || 19.4 || .398 || .319 ||style="background:#ff8c00;"| .850 || 2.5 || 1.2 || 0.6 || 0.2 || 5.9
|}

Playoffs
The Knicks finished in seventh place on the year with a record of 36-30 after an up and down season. Knicks rookie guard, Iman Shumpert, tore his ACL and was estimated to be out for 7 months. Landry Fields took his position at Shooting guard in the starting lineup. On May 6, The Knicks snapped the 13 consecutive playoff losses streak, which was an NBA record. During the game, Baron Davis injured his right knee and missed the rest of the playoffs. The Knicks were eliminated in Game 5 of the first round to the Miami Heat.

Game log

|- style="background:#fcc;"
| 1
| April 28
| @ Miami
| 
| J.R. Smith (17)
| Carmelo Anthony (10)
| Carmelo Anthony (3)
| American Airlines Arena19,621
| 0–1
|- style="background:#fcc;"
| 2
| April 30
| @ Miami
| 
| Carmelo Anthony (30)
| Carmelo Anthony (9)
| Baron Davis (6)
| American Airlines Arena19,621
| 0–2
|- style="background:#fcc;"
| 3
| May 3
| Miami
| 
| Carmelo Anthony (22)
| Tyson Chandler (15)
| Baron Davis (3)
| Madison Square Garden19,763
| 0–3
|- style="background:#cfc;"
| 4
| May 6
| Miami
| 
| Carmelo Anthony (41)
| Amar'e Stoudemire (10)
| Carmelo Anthony, J.R. Smith (4)
| Madison Square Garden19,763
| 1–3
|- style="background:#fcc;"
| 5
| May 9
| @ Miami
| 
| Carmelo Anthony (35)
| Tyson Chandler (11)
| Mike Bibby (6)
| American Airlines Arena19,754
| 1–4

Awards, records, and milestones

Awards
 On February 2, Carmelo Anthony was named a 2012 NBA All-Star Game starter for the Eastern Conference.
 On February 13, Jeremy Lin was named Eastern Conference Player of the Week (February 6 though February 12).
 On April 27, Carmelo Anthony was named Eastern Conference Player of the Month for April.
 On May 2, Tyson Chandler was named Defensive Player of the Year for the 2011–2012 season.
 On May 24, Carmelo Anthony was named to the All-NBA Third Team for the 2011–2012 NBA season.
 On May 24, Tyson Chandler was named to the All-NBA Third Team for the 2011–2012 NBA season.
 On June 21, Jeremy Lin was awarded The Epic Award due to the performance he had against the Lakers in this year's first annual NBA Social Media Awards.
 On June 21, Jeremy Lin was awarded The Social Breakout Award due to the highest increase of fan across Facebook and Twitter in this year's first annual NBA Social Media Awards.
 On June 21, Landry Fields was awarded The Snap Shot Award with the photo he took of his couch where Jeremy Lin slept during the season in this year's first annual NBA Social Media Awards.

Records
 On May 3, the New York Knicks set an NBA worst 13 consecutive playoff losses in an 87-70 loss to the Miami Heat in Madison Square Garden.

Milestones
 On January 18, Carmelo Anthony scored his 15,000th career point in an 88–91 loss to the Phoenix Suns.
 On April 26, Steve Novak finished the season shooting a league-leading 47% from three-point range.
 On April 26, Tyson Chandler finished the season shooting a league-leading 68% from the field.

Injuries, surgeries and disciplinary actions
 On January 21, Josh Harrellson injured broke his right wrist against the Denver Nuggets after falling on it in the first of 2 overtimes. He would have successful surgery 3 days later. He had to be sidelined for 6 weeks.
 On February 23, it was announced Iman Shumpert could not participate in the 2012 Slam Dunk Contest due to left patella tendonitis. He had sat out the 2 games following up the announcement and one game after the announcement. He returned the first game after the All-Star break.
 On March 4, Bill Walker underwent left elbow surgery to remove tissue. He missed the next 5 weeks after the surgery.
 On March 21, Jared Jeffries left a game against the Philadelphia 76ers. An MRI later showed that his surgically repaired right knee had been inflamed. Following the MRI, the Knicks announced that he would be out for 2 weeks.
 On April 1, Jeremy Lin underwent surgery to repair a torn meniscus and was out for the season.
 In Game 1 of the first round series against the Miami Heat, rookie Iman Shumpert tore his left ACL and his lateral meniscus, missing the remainder of the season.
 After a Game 2 loss in the same playoff series against Miami, Amar'e Stoudemire cut his hand as a result of punching the glass casing of a fire extinguisher in the locker room area. As a result, he missed the third game of the series after having surgery on his hand.
 In Game 4, Baron Davis tore his ACL, MCL and had a partial rupture in his patella tendon and was out for the season.
 J. R. Smith was fined US$25,000 by the league for posting an inappropriate picture on his Twitter account.

Transactions

Overview

Trades

Free agents

Many players signed with teams from other leagues due to the 2011 NBA lockout. FIBA allows players under NBA contracts to sign and play for teams from other leagues if the contracts have opt-out clauses that allow the players to return to the NBA if the lockout ends. The Chinese Basketball Association, however, only allows its clubs to sign foreign free agents who could play for at least the entire season.

See also
 2011–12 NBA season

References

New York Knicks seasons
New York Knicks
New York Knicks
2012 in sports in New York City
2010s in Manhattan
Madison Square Garden